Catherine Sauvage (26 May 1929 – 20 March 1998) was a French singer and actress.

Early life 
Born Marcelle Jeanine Saunier in Nancy, France, she moved with her family in 1940 to the Free Zone in Annecy. After high school, she turned to the theater, performing under the name Janine Saulnier. After eight years of studying piano, singing and drama, in 1950 she met Léo Ferré and fell in love with his songs. In 1952 she sang his "Paris canaille", which became a hit. In 1954, she won the "Grand Prix du Disque", a famous French award, for the song "L'Homme", again by Ferré. On tour in Canada, she made the acquaintance of Gilles Vigneault, who wrote "Mon Pays, Le Corbeau, la Manikoutai" for her.

Professional career 
Arriving in Paris, she adopted the surname Sauvage, borrowed from a childhood friend, and, began studying drama:
I did my apprenticeship with Jean-Louis Barrault, with John Vilar, Roger Blin, Marcel Marceau. [...] The chance of life allowed me to be presented to Moyses, who was the director of the cabaret Le Boeuf sur le Toit. I sang him some stuff like that, recited two or three poems. As a result, Moyses hired me the next day. I used a directory with songs including Marianne Oswald. I stayed two months at the Boeuf sur le Toit --- afterwards, I sang at the Quod Libet, a nightclub on 3 rue des Prés-At-Clerics. 
She also performed at the cabarets L'Arlequin at 131 bis, boulevard Saint-Germain, then at L'Écluse at 15, Quai des Grands Augustins, in the 6th arrondissement.

She met Léo Ferré, whom she helped in bringing recognition to his music: "It was the meeting of my life. As a happiness never comes alone, they say, Jacques Canetti came to hear me a beautiful evening. He was always looking for artists for the record company of which he was the artistic director, as well as for [the concert hall] Les Trois Baudets that he had established."

Jacques Canetti hired her in 1953 and 1954 to work at Les Trois Baudets. "So I visited that cabaret on Rue Coustou for two years. Later I was featured at the Olympia, and received a grand prize for record L'Homme with Léo Ferré."

She died in 1998, aged 68, in Bry-sur-Marne, Val-de-Marne.

Performance style 
She has always given preference to poetry set to music. Léo Ferré and Gilles Vigneault have said they considered Sauvage their best performer. Aragon, one of her favorite poets, wrote about her: "And suddenly with her voice, like a gift, every word makes complete sense."

Discography

Studio albums 
 1954: Catherine Sauvage chante ses derniers succès
 1954: Catherine Sauvage chante Léo Ferré
 1956: Ouvert la nuit
 1961: Catherine Sauvage chante Léo Ferré - volume 1
 1961: Catherine Sauvage chante Léo Ferré - volume 2
 1961: Catherine Sauvage chante Louis Aragon
 1964: Catherine Sauvage chante Kurt Weill
 1964: Chansons d'amour et de tendresse, chansons des amours déchirantes
 1966: Chansons françaises du Canada
 1969: Le Miroir aux alouettes
 1969: Chansons libertines
 1970: Larguez les amarres
 1971: Avec le temps
 1973: J'ai tout vu, tout connu
 1992: Colette: Dialogues de bêtes
 1992: Démons et merveilles (Catherine Sauvage chante Prévert)

Live albums
 1961: Chansons de cœur… chansons de tête
 1968: Le Bonheur : Catherine Sauvage à Bobino 1968
 1979: 25 ans de chansons de Léo Ferré - Volume 1
 1979: 25 ans de chansons de Léo Ferré - Volume 2
 1983: Récital à Tokyo

Compilations
 2009: Le Siècle d'or : Toi qui disais, Le Chant du Monde (2 CD)
 2011: Catherine Sauvage : Anthologie 1951-1959, Frémeaux & Associés (2 CD).

Filmography 
 1956: Paris Mob
 1966: Two Hours to Kill
 1983: The Bride Who Came from the Cold
 1983: Julien Fontanes, magistrat (1 Episode)
 1988: The Shop on Main Street

Theatre 
 1954: The Good Woman of Szechwan by Bertolt Brecht, directed by Roger Planchon, Festival of Lyon, Lyon Comedy Theatre
 1956: St. Joan by Bernard Shaw, in French, directed by Gabriel Monnet, open air production August 1956, Chateau of Annecy.
 1958: The Good Woman of Szechwan by Bertolt Brecht, directed by Roger Planchon, Theatre de la Cite Villeurbanne
 1962: Frank V by Friedrich Dürrenmatt, directed by Claude Regy and André Barsacq, Theatre Workshop
 1963: Divine Lyrics by Ramón María del Valle-Inclán, directed by Roger Blin, the Odeon Theatre
 1977: The Night of the Iguana by Tennessee Williams, directed by Andreas Voutsinas, Bouffes North

References 

 The World, 22 March 1998.
 Le Figaro, 18 May 1983.
 Newspaper Radio TV, 29 August 1974.

1929 births
1998 deaths
French stage actresses
French film actresses
Musicians from Nancy, France
20th-century French actresses
20th-century French women singers
Deaths from cancer in France